Alohi Robins-Hardy (born November 30, 1995) is a professional Filipino American volleyball player. She is currently a member of the Philippines women's volleyball team. She debuted in the Philippines with the United Volleyball Club (originally known as the COCOLIFE Asset Managers) and currently plays for the Cignal HD Spikers in the Philippine Super Liga.

Personal life 
Robins-Hardy hails from Waimānalo, Hawaii. She studied and played collegiate volleyball for the Brigham Young University. She is the cousin of Gabe Norwood a professional basketball player who plays in the PBA and member of the Philippines men's national basketball team. Her sister, Kawai, also plays volleyball for the Notre Dame de Namur University.

Clubs 
  Maunalani Volleyball Club 
  Zok Spartak Subotica (2018-2019)
  UVC - Cocolife Asset Managers (2019)
  Cignal HD Spikers (2020)

Awards

Individual 
 2019 PSL All-Filipino Conference "Best Setter"

National Team 
 2017 European Global Challenge -  Gold medal,  with Team USA CNT
 2019 ASEAN Grand Prix - Nakhon Ratchasima Leg -  Bronze medal,  with Team Philippines

Club Team 
 2019 PSL All-Filipino Conference -  Silver medal,  with Cignal HD Spikers
 2019 PSL Invitational Conference -  Bronze medal,  with Cignal HD Spikers

References 

1995 births
Living people
American women's volleyball players
21st-century American women
BYU Cougars women's volleyball players
Filipino women's volleyball players
Philippines international volleyball players